The 1971 Virginia Slims Invitational of New York was a women's tennis tournament that took place at the 34th Street Armory in New York in the United States. It was part of the 1971 Virginia Slims Circuit and was held from March 24 through March 27, 1971. Second-seeded Rosie Casals won the tournament and earned $5,000 first-prize money.

Finals

Singles
 Rosie Casals defeated  Billie Jean King 6–4, 6–4

Prize money

References

Virginia Slims Invitational of New York
Virginia Slims Invitational of New York
Virginia Slims of New York
Virginia Slims Invitational
Virginia Slims Invitational of New York
Virginia Slims Invitational of New York
Tennis tournaments in New York City